Emery S. Hetrick (1931 Columbus, Ohio-February 4, 1987) was an American psychiatrist and one of the founders of the Hetrick-Martin Institute (HMI), originally known as the Institute for the Protection of Lesbian and Gay Youth (IPLGY), which in turn founded the Harvey Milk High School in New York City.

Biography
His partner, both personally and at the HMI, was A. Damien Martin. In 2015, both were named Icons for LGBT History Month.  As a couple, they’d been together since 1975 and lived together on the Upper East Side of Manhattan.  They are buried together at Green-Wood Cemetery in Brooklyn.

A 1953 graduate of Ohio State University, he went on to graduate in 1957 from the Cornell University Medical School.  

Hetrick had been an attending psychiatrist and supervisor at the Harlem Hospital Center and associate medical director of Pfizer’s Roerig Division. He started working for them in 1979 and resigned in 1986 for health reasons.

At Harlem Hospital, Hetrick had been chief of their psychiatric crisis and emergency treatment unit (1976-1979) and at  Gouverneur Diagnostic and Treatment Center, from 1974 until 1976, was Acting Chief of the Psychiatry Department.

He was the first psychiatrist hired by the Ackerman Institute for the Family.

Hetrick died in of AIDS related respiratory failure at the age of 56.

Publications
Innovations in Psychotherapy with Homosexuals, co-editor. Monograph published by the American Psychiatric Press

References

1931 births
1987 deaths
20th-century American LGBT people
American psychiatrists
Burials at Green-Wood Cemetery
Weill Cornell Medical College alumni
LGBT educators
LGBT physicians
LGBT people from Ohio
Ohio State University alumni
People from Columbus, Ohio
People from the Upper East Side
AIDS-related deaths in New York (state)
Pfizer people
20th-century American male writers